Johann Traxler (6 February 1959 – 11 August 2011) was an Austrian cyclist. He competed at the 1980 Summer Olympics and the 1984 Summer Olympics.

References

External links
 

1959 births
2011 deaths
Austrian male cyclists
Olympic cyclists of Austria
Cyclists at the 1980 Summer Olympics
Cyclists at the 1984 Summer Olympics
Sportspeople from Upper Austria
People from Freistadt District